is an athletic stadium in Miyoshi, Hiroshima, Japan.

External links

Athletics (track and field) venues in Japan
Football venues in Japan
Sports venues in Hiroshima Prefecture
Sports venues completed in 1993
1993 establishments in Japan